Nysa or Nyssa ( flourished 1st century BC) was queen consort of Bithynia. She was married to king Nicomedes IV of Bithynia. 

She was a daughter of Ariarathes VI of Cappadocia. She married Nicomedes before her became king, when her father-in-law Nicomedes III was still alive. In 94 BC, her spouse became king. 

Granius Licinianus claims that she encouraged a conflict between her spouse and his brother Socrates Chrestus, which resulted in the latter to seek refuge at the court of Mithridates VI Eupator.

References

1st-century BC Greek women
1st-century BC Greek people
Queens of Bithynia